In 1995 and 2000, the Rugby League International Federation held an Emerging Nations Tournament alongside the Rugby League World Cup. The competition was designed to allow teams who have failed to qualify for the World Cup proper a chance to play on the international stage. 
A third tournament took place in 2018.

See also

 List of international rugby league teams
 Rugby League World Cup

References

External links
 RLIF.ORG - Rugby League International Federation

 
Emerging Nations Tournament